The 2003 Malaysian Grand Prix (officially the 2003 Petronas Malaysian Grand Prix) was a Formula One motor race held on 23 March 2003 at the Sepang International Circuit. It was the second race of the 2003 Formula One season, and it was won by Kimi Räikkönen driving the MP4-17 for  McLaren-Mercedes. This was Räikkönen's first Formula One Grand Prix victory. As well, Fernando Alonso scored his first pole position and podium finish.

Before the race, McLaren's David Coulthard was leading the championship however the Scot retired on lap three, handing the championship lead to his teammate, Kimi Räikkönen who finished third in the previous race.

Report

Background
David Coulthard was leading the championship after winning the first race of the season. Montoya was second. Kimi Räikkönen, Michael Schumacher and Jarno Trulli were in Third, Fourth and Fifth respectively.

Before the race rain was predicted with the likelihood of heavy showers at 60 per cent. High humidity was also predicted by some people however, causing the teams to be split in terms of tactics.

Practice
The first Friday practice session saw Fernando Alonso fastest with a time of 1:37.693 and his teammate, Jarno Trulli, two tenths of a second slower putting him in third. Giancarlo Fisichella separated the Renault's with second fastest in the Jordan EJ13.

The second session saw Ferrari take over with Michael Schumacher completely eclipsing the efforts of Alonso in the previous session. He went fastest with a 1:34.980. His teammate, Rubens Barrichello, managed second with a 1:35.681 lap at the end of the session.

Race

Both the BAR of Jacques Villeneuve and the Toyota of Cristiano da Matta failed on the grid, causing them to start from the pit lane; however, this caused confusion after the warm-up lap, forcing Giancarlo Fisichella to reverse into his grid spot, the second-time the Italian took up the wrong position at this circuit. Alonso led the all-Renault front row and led the cars into the first corner, but Michael Schumacher, who started from third position, tangled whilst attempting to pass Jarno Trulli, knocking Trulli into a spin and dropping him to last. Schumacher was forced to pit for a new nosecone and after serving a drive-through penalty for the incident, dropped to the rear of the field. He later accepted blame for the incident.

A chain reaction further back in the field caused Jaguar driver Antônio Pizzonia to rear-end Juan Pablo Montoya, removing the latter's rear wing. Montoya was forced to pit, losing two laps during a rear-wing replacement. As a result, David Coulthard of McLaren-Mercedes was left in second position, but his prospects were ended on the second lap with an electronics failure. He later criticised the team. His team-mate Räikkönen had moved into second place by passing the Sauber of Nick Heidfeld. On the tenth lap, Ferrari's Rubens Barrichello passed Heidfeld for third place.

The podium positions stayed that way with Räikkönen cutting into the lead when Alonso pitted first out of the front three on lap 14, a sign that he was carrying a lighter fuel load during qualifying. Alonso did break the record for youngest driver to lead a race (the previous record having remained since 1951). Räikkönen circulated until lap 19, using the lighter fuel load to post faster lap times, and after his pit stop emerged ahead of Alonso.

Barrichello also made up time before pitting on the 21st lap, but did not clear Alonso upon his return to the track, with a deficit of over three seconds. By this stage, Trulli had recovered to 6th place, challenging the BAR of Jenson Button for fifth position. Räikkönen gradually extended his lead, which reached 17.8 s by the 33rd lap. Button pitted on the 34th lap, allowing Trulli clean air to post faster lap times.

Alonso then pitted on the 35th lap, freeing Barrichello, who did not pit until the 38th lap and re-entered the race ahead of Alonso. Räikkönen was the last of the contenders to pit, doing so on lap 40 and further extending his lead. Meanwhile, a delay with a fuel nozzle had denied Trulli the opportunity to jump Button in the pits. Michael Schumacher, with a light car at the end of his stint, passed Trulli and Button in quick succession before conceding his gains with a final pit stop.

On lap 41  Justin Wilson pulled into the Minardi garage to retire, as the straps on his HANS device worked loose and pinched his shoulders, resulting in temporary paralysis of both his arms. It took the team nearly 10 minutes to ease Wilson out of the car before he was taken to hospital. He recovered before the next race.

On the 51st lap, Trulli spun attempting to pass Button. He and Schumacher eventually passed Button on the final corner after the Briton made a mistake. Räikkönen eventually earned his maiden Grand Prix victory with a large margin of 39s.

Classification

Qualifying

Race

Championship standings after the race 

Drivers' Championship standings

Constructors' Championship standings

Note: Only the top five positions are included for both sets of standings.

References

External links 
Complete Race Guide FIA.com
Race Report - An emotional first win for Raikkonen Formula1.com
Race Facts and Incidents PDF File
Circuit and Facts PDF File

Malaysian Grand Prix
Malaysian Grand Prix
Grand Prix
Malaysian Grand Prix